The Hotel Majestic St. Louis in St. Louis, Missouri, United States (formerly known as the DeSoto Hotel and the Omni Majestic Hotel) is a restored 91-room historic hotel built in 1913–1914. It is listed on the National Register of Historic Places in 1984.

It also has brick curtain walls
and concrete floors. The hotel was designed as a tri-part structure, including a base, shaft, and capital, and is divided by the use of white terracotta.

Following major renovations over the course of 2018 and 2019, the hotel is planned to debut in August 2020 as Le Méridien St. Louis Downtown.

History

Majestic Hotel
First opened near the end of September, 1914, the hotel is one of St. Louis' few hotels which date from before World War I. The building's Renaissance Revival design is an example of common styles in St. Louis architecture in the 1920s. The hotel was built to serve middle-class guests, but it had advanced fireproofing, two restaurants, and a rathskeller.

In 1913, construction for the hotel began, replacing a three-story building. The hotel cost about $250,000 to build. However, it is unclear who designed the hotel. Plans for the hotel give credit to Harry F. Roach, while building permits list the architect as Albert B. Groves. Both men were well-known St. Louis architects who had each designed various other hotels, but were never in partnership.

DeSoto Hotel
The Majestic Hotel was later renamed the DeSoto Hotel and still served guests until 1979, when it was announced that the building would be replaced with a parking garage due to the high cost needed to restore the building so it could meet more recent building codes. However, the hotel was given to new owners, and they planned to renovate the building for office space. However, a joint venture by Eugene Wolff, Dick Deutsch, and Southwestern Bell, called Majestic Associates, used $7 million to restore the building into a luxury hotel, called the Hotel Majestic. Southwestern Bell also spent $15 million in 1987 to renovate the building. Robert G. Pope of Southwestern Bell was in charge of this renovation.

Crowne Plaza, Omni Majestic Hotel & Le Méridien St. Louis Downtown

In 1996, the hotel was sold for $4.3 million to Bray & Gillespie LLC, which operated it under the Crowne Plaza brand.  In 1997, Omni Hotels acquired the hotel from Crowne Plaza and rebranded the property as the Omni Majestic Hotel until 2016, when Omni Hotels & Resorts sold it to Iowa-based Hawkeye Hotels. Hawkeye has been conducting a major renovation of the hotel throughout 2018 and 2019, and will introduce Marriott's Le Méridien brand in St. Louis upon completion in August 2020.

References

Renaissance Revival architecture in Missouri
Hotel buildings completed in 1913
Hotels in St. Louis
Hotel buildings on the National Register of Historic Places in Missouri
National Register of Historic Places in St. Louis
1913 establishments in Missouri
Downtown St. Louis
Buildings and structures in St. Louis